Monster Rancher Battle Card Episode II, known in Japan as , is a video game developed and published by Tecmo for PlayStation in 2000. It is the second and last game in Tecmo's Monster Rancher Battle Card series, featuring a card game incorporating the popular characters from the Monster Rancher series.

Reception

The game received average reviews according to the review aggregation website GameRankings. Greg Orlando of NextGen said, "Although a variant on [Monster Rancher and Monster Rancher 2], Monster Rancher Battle Card [Episode II] holds none of their whimsical fun." In Japan, Famitsu gave it a score of 27 out of 40.

The D-Pad Destroyer of GamePro said of the game, "Fans of the Monster Rancher cartoon series and PlayStation owners dying for a video card game would do well to pick up Battle Card. It's a harmless, fun card battle that requires strategy, quick thinking, and an inexhaustible appetite for cute gladiators doing what they do best - kicking ass." Bro Buzz said that the game "gets some juice from the cool, if bizarre-looking, combatants and some basic-but-action-packed animation that illustrates the various cards. The lively music makes for a credible effort to party, too, although there's just too much boring dialogue in between cards. If you're game for a change o' pace or a strategy challenge, you might just find them in these cards."

Notes

References

External links
 Monster Rancher Metropolis
 

2000 video games
Digital collectible card games
Monster Rancher
PlayStation (console) games
PlayStation (console)-only games
Tecmo games
Video games developed in Japan